Victor Emanuel Lindstrand, known as Vicke Lindstrand (27 November 1904 in Gothenburg – 7 May 1983 in Kosta) was a Swedish glass designer, textile and ceramic designer, and painter. He is considered a pioneer of Swedish glass art. His work was part of the art competitions at the 1932 Summer Olympics and the 1936 Summer Olympics.

Background
As a child, Lindstrand was interested in drawing. He had studied commercial art and worked in commercial illustration before beginning his career at the glass manufacturer Orrefors in 1928. He pioneered more daring art glass designs at Orrefors and together with Edvin Öhrström and Knut Bergqvist he invented the Ariel technique. In 1950 he joined Kosta Glasbruk as an artistic director before his retirement in 1973. At Kosta, he was the dominant designer, lending his name to many now classic designs. At this point, Lindstrand began to inject more and more colour into his creations, which resulted in iconic designs such as Trees in the Fog and Autumn. He spent the last 10 years of his life as a freelance artist working with Hanne Dreutler and Arthur Zirrnsack at Studio Glashyttan in Åhus.

He made his debut as a designer at the Stockholm World Fair in 1930, where he presented twelve glass vases with enamel decor in exotic patterns. For this he received great attention from international design publications. Lindstrand added new artistic dimensions to the already famous Orrefors glass with his unique designs and revitalization of classic forms and techniques. During his time at Orrefors he worked on engraved glass and Graal vases. With sculptor Edvin Öhrström he developed the new Ariel technique (named by his actress wife Kristina). Orrefors could not afford to keep Lindstrand during the war and between 1943 and 1950 he became creative leader at Uppsala Ekeby, where he designed many different stoneware objects ranging from pots to figural sculptures.

Monumental glass sculptures
Constructed with thousands of 8mm thick glass window panes, glued together using invisible 2 part epoxy glue (Ciba-Geigy). The flat-drawn glass used (Emmaboda, Sweden) is deep green when seen from the edge of the pane (modern float glass would be much paler).

Monumental Fountain, New York World Fair, 1939 (3m tall, 6 tons, not a flat pane construction)
Ikaros Nadel, Stuttgart, 1964 (9m tall, 24 tons, 1000 panes)  
Prisma, Norrköping, 1967 (11.5m tall, 33 ton, 3500 panes)
Grön eld, Umeå, 1970 (9m tall, 45 tons, 3000 panes)
Legend i Glas, Växjö, 1978 (5.5m tall, 12 tons, 1100 panes)

Further reading
 Plath, Iona, Decorative Arts of Sweden (1965), Courier Dover Publications, 
 Berg, Per, Vicke Lindstrand: 100 år   
 Lindstrand, Vicke, Vicke Lindstrand : [utställning] 
 Jones, Mark Ian, "A blind spot? The perception of the 1950s glass designs of Vicke Lindstrand." (2006), Helsinki, International Committee of Design History and Studies ICDHS Nordic Forum for Design History.  http://tm.uiah.fi/connecting/proceedings/Jones.pdf
 Jones, Mark Ian, "Reinventing Tradition. Vicke Lindstrand and the Kosta Dilemma" (2006) Delft University of Technology, The Netherlands, Design History Society. 
 Jones, Mark Ian, "Vicke Lindstrand On The Periphery". 
 Thor, Lars, "Legend i Glas" (1982), Liber,

References

External links
 Some of Lindstrand works
 Lindstrand works at The Cleveland Museum of Art
 Link to Glassfromsweden.com with detailed information about Vicke Lindstrand
 Vicke Lindstrand

1904 births
1983 deaths
People from Gothenburg
Swedish designers
Glass artists
Olympic competitors in art competitions